The list of Doubles champions at the Wimbledon Championships can be found at:

List of Wimbledon Gentlemen's Doubles champions
List of Wimbledon Ladies' Doubles champions
List of Wimbledon Mixed Doubles champions

Doubles
Wimbledon